The General People's Congress (GPC) is a political party in Yemen. It has been the de jure ruling party of Yemen since 1993, three years after unification. The party is dominated by a nationalist line, and its official ideology is Arab nationalism, seeking Arab unity. In the course of the Yemeni Civil War, the party's founder and leader Ali Abdullah Saleh was killed, while the GPC fractured into three factions backing different sides in the conflict.

History
The party was established on 24 August 1982 in Sana'a, North Yemen, by President Ali Abdullah Saleh, becoming an umbrella organisation that sought to represent all political interests. Following Yemeni unification in 1990, and with Saleh continuing as president of the united country, it emerged as the largest party in the 1993 parliamentary elections, winning 123 of the 301 seats. It went on to win a majority (187) of seats in the 1997 elections amidst a boycott by the Yemeni Socialist Party.

Saleh was re-elected as president in the first direct presidential elections in 1999, and the party won a landslide victory in the 2003 parliamentary elections, winning 226 of the 301 seats. Following the elections, several independent MPs also joined the party. Saleh was re-elected again in 2006. After he was forced to stand down as a result of the Yemeni Revolution, the party's Abdrabbuh Mansur Hadi was elected as his successor. Saleh attempted to regain power over the country and the GPC in the following civil war. Rallying a large part of the GPC in 2015, he sided with the Houthis and effectively split the party into a pro-Hadi and Saleh faction.

The two factions were at war with each other until Saleh attempted to overthrow the Houthis. This power grab failed, however, and the former president as well as party secretary general Aref al-Zouka were killed in the Battle of Sana'a of late 2017. Following Ali Abdullah Saleh's death, the GPC fractured further, with a large part of the former Saleh followers pledging allegiance to the Houthis. This pro-Houthi part of the GPC continued to support the rebel government in Sana'a, and elected Sadeq Ameen Abu Rass as the new GPC chairman. One member of the pro-Houthi faction explained that "Ali Abdullah Saleh was killed by the Houthis. If we follow his direction and resist the Houthis, we will meet the same end as Saleh. So we prefer to support the strongest force on the ground."

Another group of Saleh loyalists fled from the Houthis. Though this GPC faction then allied itself with Hadi and the Saudi Arabia-led international coalition, it still remained completely separate and chose Ali Abdullah Saleh's son Ahmed Saleh as new de facto leader. Meanwhile, the former president's nephew Tareq Saleh began to organize a new private army for this GPC faction.

Electoral history

Presidential elections

House of Representatives elections

References 

Arab nationalism in Yemen
Political parties in Yemen
Parties of one-party systems
Yemeni Revolution
Arab nationalist political parties
1982 establishments in North Yemen
Political parties established in 1982
Yemeni nationalism
Organizations of the Arab Spring
Organizations of the Yemeni Crisis (2011–present)